B-mode may refer to:

B-mode (brightness mode) image, a two-dimensional ultrasound image and the most common type
B-modes, a pattern of polarized light originating from the Big Bang